Ivan Yakovlevich Bilibin (– 7 February 1942) was a Russian illustrator and stage designer who took part in the Mir iskusstva, contributed to the Ballets Russes, co-founded the Union of Russian Artists and from 1937 was a member of the Artists' Union of the USSR. Ivan Bilibin gained popularity with his illustrations of Russian folk tales and Slavic folklore. Throughout his career he was inspired by the art and culture of Rus'.

Biography
Ivan Bilibin was born in Tarkhovka, a suburb of St. Petersburg. He studied in 1898 at Anton Ažbe Art School in Munich, where he was heavily influenced by Art Nouveau and the German satirical journal Simplicissimus, and then under Ilya Repin in St. Petersburg. After graduating in May 1901 he went to Munich, where he completed his training with the painter Anton Ažbe.

In the period 1902 to 1904, working under the Russian Museum (Museum of His Imperial Majesty Alexander III)  he traveled to the Vologda, Olonetsk and Arkhangelsk Governorates, performing ethnographic research, and examining examples of Russian wooden architecture. He published his findings in the monograph Народное творчество русского Севера (Folk Arts of the Russian North) in 1904. Old Russian art had a great influence on his works. Another influence on his art was traditional Japanese prints and Renaissance woodcuts.

After the formation of the artists' association Mir Iskusstva, where he was an active member, his entry into the newspaper and book graphics scene began with a commission for the design of magazine Mir Iskusstva in 1899, later contributing essays on Russian folk art. Artistic design of other magazines such as Dog Rose (Шиповник) and productions of a Moscow publishing house followed. Bilibin gained renown in 1899, when he released his illustrations of Russian fairy tales. During the Russian Revolution of 1905, he drew revolutionary cartoons, especially for the magazine Zhupel (Жупелъ), which in 1906 became prohibited because of his illustration depicting the emperor as a donkey. He served as the designer for the 1909 première production of Nikolai Rimsky-Korsakov's The Golden Cockerel.

In 1911, Bilibin was hired by the State Paper Manufacturing Section to illustrate ball programs, exhibition and book posters, postcards for the Red Cross's Society of St. Eugenia, and envelopes and stationery with the Russian Bogatyrs.

After the October Revolution in 1917, Bilibin left Russia when the revolution proved alien to him. Hungry for a new exotic environment, in 1920 Bilibin went to stay in Egypt. He moved to Cairo and Alexandria where he painted for the Greek colony. In Cairo he specialized in the Byzantine-style art that was in demand by the Greek colony for icons and frescoes. He was also enraptured by the architecture of mosques and their "head-spinning ornamentation". Bilibin then settled in Paris in 1925, where he took to decorating private mansions and Orthodox churches. He still longed for his homeland, and, after decorating the Soviet Embassy, he returned in 1936 to Soviet Russia. Bilibin died during the Siege of Leningrad, starving within the city when he refused to leave, and was buried in a collective grave.

Marital life

In 1902 Bilibin married his former student, the Irish-Russian painter and illustrator of children's stories Mary Chambers (Мария Яковлевна Чемберс). They had two sons, Alexander (1903) and Ivan (1908). In 1912 he again married a former student, the art school graduate Renée O'Connell (Рене Рудольфовна О'Коннель), granddaughter of Daniel O'Connell. In 1923 he married the painter Aleksandra Shchekatikhina-Pototskaya (Александра Васильевна Щекатихина-Потоцкая), with whom he had a joint exhibition in Amsterdam in 1929.

Publications

Folktales published by the "Department for the Production of State Documents"
 . alt link

 , pdf
Collections in translated tales : 
 , twelve selected illustrations 
 , selection from "State Department" work (1899-1902) that includes Sister Alionushka..; Tsarevich Ivan, the Firebird, and the Grey Wolf; The Frog Tsarevna; Vasilisa..; Feather of Finist; White Duck; and Maria Morevna. Main illustrations only

Illustrations of Pushkin's tales

 , unpublished

Other

 , unpublished

Gallery

References

External links 

Works of Ivan Bilibin at Cascadia Graphics
  at www.scumdog.demon.co.uk

1876 births
1942 deaths
People from Sestroretsk
People from Sankt-Peterburgsky Uyezd
Illustrators from the Russian Empire
Painters from the Russian Empire
Opera designers
20th-century illustrators of fairy tales
19th-century male artists from the Russian Empire
Victims of the Siege of Leningrad
Deaths by starvation